The 2014 FILA Wrestling World Cup – Men's Greco-Roman was the third of a set of three FILA Wrestling World Cups in 2014 – one for each major discipline. The event took place in Tehran, Iran at Shohadaye haftom Tir Indoor Stadium May 15 and 16, 2014.  The competition was originally scheduled for Tyumen, Russia in February 2014, but was moved to avoid a conflict with the 2014 Winter Olympics.

Pool stage

Pool A

Pool B

Rank stage

Final classement

References 

2014 Wrestling World Cup
2014 in Iranian sport
International wrestling competitions hosted by Iran